Asen Karaslavov (born 8 June 1980 in Asenovgrad) is a former Bulgarian footballer who plays as a defender.

Career

Botev Plovdiv
Karaslavov began his career with Asenovets, before he was scouted by Botev Plovdiv in 1994. He joined the first team of Botev after the 1999–00 winter break, in January 2000. Karaslavov made his professional debut on 5 April 2000 in the Bulgarian Cup match against Neftochimic Burgas, coming on as a substitute for Kostadin Vidolov. He made his A PFG debut on 20 May, in a 1–0 home loss against Chernomorets Burgas. Karaslavov would play five more matches that season.

The 2000–01 season saw Karaslavov breaking into the starting lineup on a regular basis under managers Marin Bakalov, Dimitar Mladenov and Dinko Dermendzhiev. He scored his first A PFG goal for Botev on 5 August 2000 in a 3–1 home victory over Hebar Pazardzhik. During the season, he earned 22 appearances, scored two goals.

Slavia Sofia
In 2001 Karaslavov signed a three-season deal with Slavia Sofia. He made his team debut on 3 August 2001 in a 0–1 away victory over Cherno More Varna. He took over the captaincy of Slavia when Dimitar Rangelov was transferred in 2006, a responsibility he held until leaving the club in 2007.

Greuther Fürth
In 2007 Karaslavov transferred to SpVgg Greuther Fürth.

Botev Plovdiv
On 19 June 2012, Karaslavov re-signed for Botev Plovdiv on a 2+1 year contract. On the eve of the 2012–13 season, he was selected for captain of the team. Karaslavov made his second Botev debut in a 3–0 win against Slavia Sofia on 11 August. He retired at the end of the season because of having too many injuries and became director of football.

References

External links

1980 births
Living people
Bulgarian footballers
Bulgaria international footballers
Association football defenders
Botev Plovdiv players
PFC Slavia Sofia players
SpVgg Greuther Fürth players
First Professional Football League (Bulgaria) players
2. Bundesliga players
Bulgarian expatriate footballers
Expatriate footballers in Germany
People from Asenovgrad